The London Labour Party mayoral selection of 2007 was the process by which the Labour Party selected its candidate for Mayor of London, to stand in the 2008 mayoral election. Ken Livingstone, the incumbent Mayor of London, was selected to stand.

Candidates
Ken Livingstone, Mayor of London; Leader of the Greater London Council 1981–1986; Member of Parliament for Brent East 1987–2001.

Result
On 3 May 2007 the Labour Party announced Ken Livingstone, the incumbent mayor, had been selected as their mayoral candidate. The announcement was made following consultations with London Labour Party members.

See also
2008 London mayoral election

References

External links
London Labour Party website

London Labour Party
Mayoral elections in London
2007 in London
2007 elections in the United Kingdom
Ken Livingstone